The 2011 New Zealand voting system referendum was a referendum held in conjunction with the 26 November 2011 general election to decide whether to retain the existing mixed member proportional (MMP) voting system, or to change to another voting system, in electing members of parliament to the New Zealand House of Representatives.

The questions asked were:

Part A
Should New Zealand keep the Mixed Member Proportional (MMP) voting system?
I vote to keep the MMP voting system
I vote to change to another voting system

Part B
If New Zealand were to change to another voting system, which voting system would you choose?
I would choose the First Past the Post system (FPP)
I would choose the Preferential Voting system (PV)
I would choose the Single Transferable Vote system (STV)
I would choose the Supplementary Member system (SM)

Advance votes (votes cast before election day) were progressively released after polling closes at 7:00 pm on 26 November (NZDT; UTC+13). Official results for the referendum were released on 10 December 2011.

Overview

Part A

|-
! rowspan=2| Response !! rowspan=2| Votes !! colspan=2| %
|-style="background-color:#E9E9E9"
! style="text-align:center;" | valid !! style="text-align:center;" | total
|-
| style="text-align:left;" |  Yes – keep MMP I vote to keep the MMP voting system || 1,267,955 || 57.77 || 56.17
|-
| style="text-align:left;" |  No – change system I vote to change to another voting system || 926,819 || 42.23 || 41.06
|- style="background-color:#E9E9E9"
| Total valid votes || 2,194,774 || 100.00 || 97.23
|- style="background-color:#E9E9E9"
| Informal votes || 62,469 || – || 2.77
|- style="background-color:#E9E9E9"
| Total votes || 2,257,243 || – || 100.00
|- style="background-color:#E9E9E9"
| Turnout || colspan=3| 73.51%
|- style="background-color:#E9E9E9"
| Electorate || colspan=3| 3,070,847
|}

Part B

|-
! rowspan=2| Response !! rowspan=2| Votes !! colspan=2| %
|-style="background-color:#E9E9E9"
! style="text-align:center;" | valid !! style="text-align:center;" | total
|-
| style="text-align:left;" | First Past the Post (FPP) I would choose the First Past the Post system (FPP) || 704,117 || 46.66 || 31.19
|-
| style="text-align:left;" | Preferential Voting (PV) I would choose the Preferential Voting system (PV) || 188,164 || 12.47 || 8.34
|-
| style="text-align:left;" | Single Transferable Vote (STV) I would choose the Single Transferable Vote system (STV) || 252,503 || 16.30 || 11.19
|-
| style="text-align:left;" | Supplementary Member (SM) I would choose the Supplementary Member system (SM) || 364,373 || 24.14 || 16.14
|- style="background-color:#E9E9E9"
| Total valid votes || 1,509,157 || 100.00 || 66.86
|- style="background-color:#E9E9E9"
| Informal votes || 748,086 || – || 33.14
|- style="background-color:#E9E9E9"
| Total votes cast || 2,257,243 || – || 100.00 
|- style="background-color:#E9E9E9"
| Turnout || colspan=3| 73.51%
|- style="background-color:#E9E9E9"
| Electorate || colspan=3| 3,070,847
|}

Split vote

By electorate

Part A

Source:

Part B

References

External links
electionresults.govt.nz – Referendum results

2011 New Zealand voting system referendum results
Voting system referendum results
2011 referendums
Voting system referendum results
Electoral reform in New Zealand
Election results in New Zealand